Marissa Paternoster (born August 1, 1986) is an artist, singer and guitarist active in New Jersey's New Brunswick music scene. She is the lead singer and guitarist in the bands Screaming Females and Noun.

Biography 
Paternoster's parents met while both teachers for the Elizabeth Public Schools. Her mother, Leslie Okun, who Paternoster has described as "culturally Jewish", was an art teacher who now resides in Florida. Her father, Angelo Paternoster, gave her her first guitar lessons before she taught herself to play as a teen. Paternoster grew up in Elizabeth, New Jersey and attended Roselle Catholic High School and  later Rutgers University's Mason Gross School of the Arts, where she became interested in music and formed Screaming Females. An only child and an introvert, she grew up with a passion for comics, drawing, and, before long, guitar.

Recording career 
Sleater-Kinney influenced her to start a band with bassist Mike Abbate and drummer Jarrett Dougherty in 2005. In a 2012 list, she was named the 77th greatest guitarist of all time by Spin magazine.

Personal life 
Paternoster is an out lesbian and has spoken about how bands like Sleater-Kinney gave her the confidence to be a queer woman in music. Her go-to karaoke song is Meat Loaf's "Paradise by the Dashboard Light".

Discography 
 Peace Meter (2021)

References 

1986 births
Living people
Singers from New Jersey
Mason Gross School of the Arts alumni
People from Elizabeth, New Jersey
Guitarists from New Jersey
Roselle Catholic High School alumni
American lesbian musicians
LGBT people from New Jersey
21st-century American women guitarists
21st-century American guitarists
21st-century American women singers
Women punk rock singers
21st-century American singers
20th-century LGBT people
21st-century LGBT people
Don Giovanni Records artists

LGBT Jews
Jews in punk rock
Jewish feminists
Women in punk